Bear Mountain is a peak in the Sierra Nevada foothills, near Yokuts Valley, California. In the early 1900s a fire lookout tower was constructed on the mountain, now the site is mostly used to support communications equipment.

References 

Mountains of Fresno County, California